Ojos de Agua is a municipality in the Chalatenango department of El Salvador. It is about 1700 feet (or about 1.1 kilometers) from the border of Honduras and El Salvador, which is formed by the Rio Sumpul.

The name "Ojos de Agua" translates from Spanish to "Water Eyes."

Municipalities of the Chalatenango Department